Rio Grande do Norte/São Gonçalo do Amarante–Governador Aluízio Alves International Airport  is an airport in São Gonçalo do Amarante, Brazil serving Natal and its metropolitan area.

The airport is managed by Consortium Inframérica.

History
The airport was built to replace Augusto Severo International Airport.
Planning started in 2007 and envisaged an intermodal airport, focusing both on passenger and cargo transportation. The complex was expected to have the highest aircraft traffic in the North East of Brazil.

On May 12, 2011, the National Civil Aviation Agency of Brazil (ANAC) released a document opening the concession of the airport to private entrepreneurs. The auction to choose the winner took place on August 22, 2011. The winner was the Inframérica Consortium, formed by the Brazilian Engineering Group Engevix (50%) and the Argentinean Group Corporación América (50%).

Inframérica Consortium was given three years to build the passenger and cargo terminals, and is authorized to commercially exploit the facility for 25 years (with one possible five-year extension). Differently from Brazilian airports in the process of privatization, in which the state oeorator Infraero retains 49% of the shares, in the case of Natal Consórcio Inframérica got 100% of the shares. On February 6, 2012, the consortium also won the concession forBrasília–Presidente Juscelino Kubitschek International Airport. 

The airport opened for operations on May 31, 2014, when airlines moved their domestic operations to the facility. International operations were moved a few days later. The airport is the first in Brazil operated by a private sector company.

On March 10, 2021, it was announced that the National Civil Aviation Agency of Brazil had approved a new concession process for the airport, as per a request from Consortium Inframérica on March 5, 2020. It was expected that a new bidding would take place in 2021.

Airlines and destinations

Passenger

Statistics

Access

See also
List of airports in Brazil

External links

References

Airports in Rio Grande do Norte
Airports established in 2014
2014 establishments in Brazil